Alexander Yurevich Borodai (born July 25, 1972) is a Russian member of the State Duma of the 8th convocation for the party United Russia. Borodai was Prime Minister of the self-proclaimed Donetsk People's Republic in 2014 after the Donetsk People's Republic declared its independence from Ukraine on 12 May 2014, Borodai was appointed as Prime Minister by the republic's Supreme Council on May 16, 2014. Borodai, a Russian citizen, had earlier worked as a political adviser to Sergey Aksyonov, the prime minister of the Republic of Crimea. On 7 August 2014, Borodai announced his resignation. He was succeeded by Alexander Zakharchenko; under Zakharchenko, Borodai became Deputy Prime Minister.

In his interview to Novaya Gazeta Borodai acknowledged that he has known Igor Girkin since after the war in Transnistria.

Personal
Alexander Borodai lives in Moscow. He is a son of Yury Borodai, a scholar in philosophy. Both his father and Borodai himself were "friendly" with Lev Gumilyov, a Eurasianist philosopher.

Career and education
Borodai has a degree in philosophy from Moscow State University. In 1994 he worked for the RIA Novosti as a military correspondent during the First Chechen War. Since 1996 he worked for the openly anti-semitic  newspaper, which has called for pogroms against Jews. Since 1998 he worked as a "political technologist" specialising in elections. Since 2001 he has headed the consulting business "Sotsiomaster" specializing in crisis management. Borodai and the future military commander of the Donetsk People's Republic Igor Strelkov were close associates of the far-right nationalist Russian businessmen Konstantin Malofeev.

According to Russian media, he was appointed as a deputy director of Russian FSB State Security in 2002 at the age of 35, when he held the rank of major general – Borodai dismissed this as a hoax. He currently has a consultancy in Moscow and worked at a major investment fund.

Nationalism
In the 1990s he edited a Russian newspaper  (Завтра -"Tomorrow"), run by journalist Alexander Prokhanov.

In December 2011, Borodai and Prokhanov co-founded the "patriotic" Web TV channel Den-TV (“Day”). Den-TV's programming has regularly included Konstantin Dushenov, who has previously been imprisoned for anti-semitic incitement.

Politics
Borodai refers to himself as "professional consultant" with expertise in ethnic conflict. “I have resolved all kinds of complicated conflict situations,” he told journalists.

In 2002, according to the Moscow Times newspaper, he also dismissed reports that he had been appointed a deputy director of Russia’s Federal Security Service (FSB) as a hoax arranged for his 30th birthday.

Crimea
Borodai worked as an advisor to appointed Crimea governor Sergei Aksyonov. Borodai claims he worked as a “political strategist” during the annexation of Crimea by Russia, and states that the political forces that facilitated the takeover are the same as those active in the Donetsk Republic: "Naturally the people who set up these popular movements and were the initiators are the same people, they are connected to each other... So when I finished the work in Crimea I automatically... came here to work in southeast Ukraine.”

Donetsk
Following the 2014 Donetsk status referendum; on 16 May 2014 Borodai was appointed Prime Minister of the Donetsk People's Republic.

On 28 July 2014, Borodai left Donetsk for Russia and returned On 4 August.

In a press conference in Donetsk on 7 August 2014, Borodai announced his resignation as Prime Minister. In this press conference he stated “I came here as a crisis manager, a start-upper, if you want. I’ve managed to achieve a lot in the past several months, the DPR has been established as a state”. As Prime Minister he was replaced by Alexander Zakharchenko. Borodai (also) stated he would become Zakharchenko's Deputy Prime Minister. He further stated in the 7 August 2014 press conference that he believed a "native Muscovite" like him should not lead the Donetsk People's Republic. In 2017 Boroday claimed (talking to Reuters) that Zakharchenko succeeded him in a Russian government effort "to try to show the West that the uprising was a grassroots phenomenon".

Russia
In the 2021 Russian legislative election Borodai was elected to the State Duma for the party United Russia.

Security car blown up in Ukraine

On 7 November 2022, a car driven by Borodai was nearly struck by a French HPD-2A2 in the Kherson region. The security vehicle in front of his was reportedly hit by the land mine, blowing out windows and tires. Video showed a camouflaged HPD-2A2 which his own vehicle missed by "millimetres".

References

Living people
People of Anti-Maidan
Pro-Russian people of the 2014 pro-Russian unrest in Ukraine
Politicians from Moscow
Moscow State University alumni
1972 births
Russian nationalists
Defenders of the White House (1993)
People of the Donetsk People's Republic
Pro-Russian people of the war in Donbas
Russian individuals subject to the U.S. Department of the Treasury sanctions
Russian individuals subject to European Union sanctions
Eighth convocation members of the State Duma (Russian Federation)
United Russia politicians